Doucen is a town and commune in Biskra Province, Algeria.

References

Communes of Biskra Province
Biskra Province

DOUCEN
 It is a city 400 km from Algiers, 80 km from Biskra and 20 km from Ouled Jalal.
DOUCEN is considered one of the most important agricultural areas in Algeria, especially palm plantations, and is famous for the quality of its dates, most notably the Tigris Nour variety.
The name DOUCEN has many ancient historical accounts, one of which means "low place" in the Berber language where it is considered a fertile plain.
(Berberal Pyrenees), written as "doucen"
Dawson's residents are 100% Arab and Muslim...
The city of DOUCEN is considered one of the most important, oldest and richest cities in Algeria.. It is the most spacious oasis
It is the oases of the bride of Zyban in Biskra. It was built by the Romans and later by the Muslims.
It also witnessed the presence of the Ottoman Turks, similar to the area - Qadir al-Sultan - (Sultan's Lake).
 The Dawson tribe was inhabited by two tribes, Bouzid and Awlad Sidi Suleiman. In 1854, the French opened a huge fortress called the Red Tower. The French built it at the expense of the sweat of the locals in an elevated area called EL-SATHA so that the French army could monitor and suppress the movements of the population. Years later, resistance erupted and the two tribes cooperated in defeating French colonialism following the famous Bouzid revolution in the Al-Amiri region in 1876. It was led by Colonel Ahmed Talib.
It is described as the city of martyrs.. During the era of independence, the city of DOUCEN shone...
Dawson City passes through National Route 46 and is an area rich in antiquities. There are believed to be deposits, minerals, and hydrocarbons at DOUCEN. It is also considered an area suitable for the production of solar energy and is characterized by the abundance of artesian wells and fertile agricultural lands that produce the best types of vegetables and fruits such as pumpkins and tomatoes, a type of DOUCENEYA.